John F. Campbell (born March 3, 1954) is an American politician from Vermont. Campbell, a Democrat, is a member of the Vermont Senate, representing the Windsor Vermont Senate District since 2001. He was the Senate Majority Leader of the Vermont Senate from 2003 to January 5, 2011, when he was elected President pro tempore of the Vermont Senate for the legislative session. He was succeeded by Tim Ashe of the Vermont Progressive Party in 2017.

References

External links
 Senator John F. Campbell at the Vermont General Assembly
 Senator John F. Campbell (VT) profile at Project Vote Smart
 John F. Campbell career profile at OpenSecrets

1954 births
Living people
Democratic Party Vermont state senators
Majority leaders of the Vermont Senate
Presidents pro tempore of the Vermont Senate
People from New Hyde Park, New York
People from Windsor County, Vermont
University of Florida alumni
21st-century American politicians